Joshipura is a city and a municipality in Junagadh district in the Indian state of Gujarat.

Demographics
 India census, Joshipura had a population of 28,757. Males constitute 52% of the population and females 48%. Joshipura has an average literacy rate of 78%, higher than the national average of 59.5%: male literacy is 82%, and female literacy is 74%. In Joshipura, 12% of the population is under 6 years of age.

The city is well connected with the state highway.

References

Cities and towns in Junagadh district